Baghdad of Peace (Baghdad as-salam) was an electoral alliance in Baghdad, Iraq, formed on the initiative of the Islamic Dawa Party.

The alliance consisted of:
 Islamic Dawa Party
 Islamic Dawa Party - Iraq Organisation
 Islamic Action Organisation
 Islamic Union for the Fayli Kurds of Iraq
 Islamic Vanguard Party

The bloc fielded 51 candidates in the 2005 election to the Baghdad Governorate Council. The alliance got 264,130 votes. Eleven members were able to get elected, making the bloc the second largest in the Council.

References

2005 establishments in Iraq
Defunct political party alliances in Iraq